This article contains information about the literary events and publications of 1901.

Events

January 31 – Anton Chekhov's Three Sisters (Три сeстры, Tri sestry) opens at the Moscow Art Theatre, directed by Constantin Stanislavski and Vladimir Nemirovich-Danchenko with Stanislavski as Vershinin, Olga Knipper as Masha, Margarita Savetskaya as Olga, Maria Andreyeva as Irina, and Maria Lilina (Stanislavsky's wife) as Natasha.
February 22 – Leo Tolstoy is excommunicated from the Russian Orthodox Church.
May 1 – Publication of Maurice Maeterlinck's The Life of the Bee in Belgium. 
May 6 – Swedish dramatist August Strindberg, 52, marries his third wife, the Swedish-Norwegian actress Harriet Bosse, 23, after an engagement in March during rehearsals for his play Easter (Påsk).
May 25 – Chekhov marries Olga Knipper in a quiet ceremony.
May 28 – Cherry v. Des Moines Leader is decided in the Iowa Supreme Court, upholding the right to publish critical reviews.
June 28 – G. K. Chesterton marries Frances Blogg at St Mary Abbots, Kensington.
July – The first modern performances of Everyman, the 15th-century morality play, are given by William Poel's Elizabethan Stage Society outdoors at the Charterhouse in London.
July 24 – O. Henry is released from prison in Columbus, Ohio after serving three years for embezzlement.
October 
Thomas Mann's first novel, Buddenbrooks, is published in Berlin.
The Irish Literary Theatre project gives its final performance.
October 23 – Mark Twain receives an honorary doctorate of literature from Yale University. In the same month he moves to Riverdale, New York.
December 2 – The Romanian literary review Sămănătorul is founded.
December 10 – The first Nobel Prize in Literature is awarded, to French poet Sully Prudhomme.
unknown date – World's Classics series of publications is founded by Grant Richards in England.

New books

Fiction
Ignacio Manuel Altamirano – El Zarco 
Leonid Andreyev – «повести» (stories)
 E.F. Benson – The Luck of the Vails
René Boylesve – La Becquée
Samuel Butler – Erewhon Revisited
Hall Caine – The Eternal City
Winston Churchill – The Crisis
Colette – Claudine à Paris
Joseph Conrad and Ford Madox Ford – The Inheritors
Victoria Cross – Anna Lombard
Patrick S. Dinneen – Cormac Ó Conaill (first novel in Irish published complete in book form)
George Douglas – The House with the Green Shutters
Miles Franklin – My Brilliant Career
Géza Gárdonyi – A láthatatlan ember (The Invisible Man)
Henry James – The Sacred Fount
Johannes V. Jensen – The Fall of the King
Rudyard Kipling – Kim
Jean Lorrain
Monsieur de Phocas
Le Vice errant
George Barr McCutcheon – Graustark: The Story of a Love Behind a Throne
Thomas Mann – Buddenbrooks
George Moore – Sister Theresa
Frank Norris – The Octopus
Charles-Louis Philippe – Bubu de Montparnasse
Luigi Pirandello – L'Esclusa (The Excluded Woman)
Liane de Pougy – Idylle Saphique
José Maria de Eça de Queiroz – A Cidade e as Serras
M. P. Shiel
Lord of the Sea
The Purple Cloud
Bram Stoker and Valdimar Ásmundsson – Makt Myrkranna (Powers of Darkness, Icelandic language adaptation of Stoker's Dracula)
Rabindranath Tagore – Nastanirh (নষ্টনীড়, The Broken Nest)
William Alexander Taylor – Intermere
Jules Verne
The Sea Serpent (Les Histoires de Jean-Marie Cabidoulin)
The Village in the Treetops (Le Village aérien)
H. G. Wells – The First Men in the Moon
Émile Zola – Travail

Children and young people
John Kendrick Bangs – Mr. Munchausen
L. Frank Baum
American Fairy Tales
The Master Key
Dot and Tot of Merryland
Evelyn Everett-Green – True Stories of Girl Heroines

Drama
Gabriele D'Annunzio – Francesca da Rimini
J. M. Barrie – Quality Street
Roberto Bracco – Lost in the Dark (Sperduti nel buio)
Hall Caine – The Eternal City
Anton Chekhov – Three Sisters
Clyde Fitch – The Climbers
Haralamb Lecca – Quinta. Suprema forță
Wilhelm Meyer-Förster – Old Heidelberg (Alt Heidelberg) 
Louis N. Parker – The Cardinal
August Strindberg – A Dream Play (Ett drömspel, published)
Stanisław Wyspiański
Warszawianka (Varsovian Anthem, stage première)
The Wedding (Wesele)

Poetry

Henry Ames Blood – Selected Poems of Henry Ames Blood
Maxim Gorky – The Song of the Stormy Petrel (Песня о Буревестнике)
Thomas Hardy – Poems of the Past and the Present
Akiko Yosano (与謝野 晶子) – Midaregami (みだれ髪, Tangled Hair)

Non-fiction
Annie Besant, Charles Webster Leadbeater – Thought-Forms: A Record of Clairvoyant Investigation
Sigmund Freud – The Psychopathology of Everyday Life (Zur Psychopathologie des Alltagslebens)
Seebohm Rowntree – Poverty, A Study of Town Life
Edith Helen Sichel – Women and Men of the French Renaissance
Rudolf Steiner – Die Mystik im Aufgange des neuzeitlichen Geisteslebens, und ihr Verhältnis zur modernen Weltan-schauung (Mysticism at the Dawn of Modern Spiritual Life, and its Relationship with Modern World-views) 
A. E. Waite – The Life of Louis Claude de Saint-Martin
Booker T. Washington – Up from Slavery
H. G. Wells – Anticipations of the Reaction of Mechanical and Scientific Progress Upon Human Life and Thought

Births
January 31 – Marie Luise Kaschnitz (Marie Luise von Holzing-Berslett), German story writer, novelist and poet (died 1974)
February 13 – Lewis Grassic Gibbon (James Leslie Mitchell), Scottish novelist (died 1935)
February 23 – Ivar Lo-Johansson, Swedish novelist and journalist (died 1990)
March 4 (or 1903) – Jean-Joseph Rabearivelo (Joseph-Casimir Rabearivelo), Malagasy Francophone poet (suicide 1937)
April 10  – Anna Kavan (Helen Emily Woods, Helen Ferguson), French-born English novelist and short story writer (died 1968)
May 1 – Antal Szerb, Hungarian writer (died 1945)
May 15 – Xavier Herbert, Australian novelist (died 1984)
June 1 – John Van Druten, English-born American dramatist (died 1957)
June 23 – Ahmet Hamdi Tanpınar, Turkish novelist and essayist (died 1962)
July 9 – Barbara Cartland, English romantic novelist, historian and playwright (died 2000) 
July 20 – Dilys Powell, English film critic (died 1995)
July 25 – Ruth Krauss, American children's author and poet (died 1993)
August 10 – Sergio Frusoni, Cape Verde poet and promoter of Cape Verdean Creole language (died 1975)
August 17 – Heðin Brú, Faroese fiction writer and translator (died 1987)
August 20 – Salvatore Quasimodo, Italian poet and translator (died 1968)
October 25 – Samuil Lehtțir, Soviet Moldovan poet, critic and literary theorist (shot 1937)
November 3 – André Malraux, French author (died 1976)
November 4 – Ernest Elmore (John Bude), English crime writer and theatre director (died 1957)
December 9 – Ödön von Horváth, Austro-Hungarian dramatist and novelist (died 1938)
December 16 – Margaret Mead, American anthropologist and author (died 1978)

Deaths
January 1 – Ignatius L. Donnelly, American politician and writer (born 1831)
January 14 – Víctor Balaguer, Catalan Spanish dramatist and poet (born 1824)
January 17 – Frederic W. H. Myers, British poet (born 1843)
January 26 – Grigore Sturdza, Moldavian and Romanian adventurer, literary sponsor and philosopher (pneumonia, born 1821)
February 2 – John Cordy Jeaffreson, English novelist and non-fiction writer (born 1831)
February 7 – Rowena Granice Steele, first female novelist in California (born 1824)
February 15 – Maurice Thompson, American novelist (born 1844)
February 18 – Anna Gardner, American author, abolitionist, teacher, reformer (born 1816)
March 19 – Philippe Gille, French dramatist (born 1831)
April 6 – George Murray Smith, English publisher (born 1824)
April 10 — Harriet Newell Kneeland Goff, reformer and author (born 1828)
April 12 – Louis Auguste Sabatier, French theologian (born 1839)
April 26 – Harriett Ellen Grannis Arey, American educator, author, editor, and publisher (born 1819)
May 24 – Charlotte Mary Yonge, English novelist (born 1823)
June 4 – Charlotte Fowler Wells, American phrenologist and publisher (born 1814)
June 5 – Dagny Juel, Norwegian writer and artists' model (shot, born 1867)
June 9 – Walter Besant, English novelist and historian (born 1836)
June 10 – Robert Williams Buchanan, Scottish poet, novelist and dramatist (born 1841)
July 7 – Johanna Spyri, Swiss children's writer (born 1827)
July 18 – Jan ten Brink, Dutch novelist (born 1834)
July 20 – William Cosmo Monkhouse, English poet and critic (born 1840)
July 27 – Brooke Foss Westcott, English theologian (born 1825)
August 4 – Harriet Pritchard Arnold, American author (born 1858)
August 9 – Vishnudas Bhave, Indian dramatist (unknown birth year)
October 28 – Paul Rée, German author and philosopher (born 1849)
October 31 – Julien Leclercq, French Symbolist poet and art critic (born 1865)
November 6 – Kate Greenaway, English children's illustrator and writer (born 1846)
November 21 – V. A. Urechia, Romanian historian, writer and politician (born 1834)
December 28 – Mary K. Buck, Bohemian-born American author (born 1849)

Awards
Nobel Prize for Literature: Sully Prudhomme

References

 
Years of the 20th century in literature